Funing County is a district of northeastern Hebei Province, China, located about  to the west of Qinhuangdao, which administers it.

Administrative divisions
The district administers 2 subdistricts, 5 towns and 2 townships.

Subdistricts:
Licheng Subdistrict, Nandaihe Subdistrict

Towns:
Funing, Liushouying, Yuguan, Taiying, Daxinzhai
Townships:
Chapeng Township, Shenhe Township

Climate

Transport
China National Highway 102
China National Highway 205
Beijing–Harbin Railway
Beijing–Qinhuangdao Railway
Datong–Qinhuangdao Railway
G1 Beijing–Harbin Expressway

References

External links
 Official site of Funing

County-level divisions of Hebei
Qinhuangdao